Graffiti Bridge is the title of two related items:

Graffiti Bridge (film), a 1990 film starring Prince
Graffiti Bridge (album), a 1990 album by Prince